Atelier Crenn is a French restaurant in the Cow Hollow neighborhood in San Francisco, California. Opened in 2011 by Dominique Crenn and Juan Contreras, the restaurant became the seventh restaurant in San Francisco Bay Area to be awarded three Michelin stars by the Michelin Guide in 2018.

History

Atelier Crenn opened in January 2011. The restaurant is an homage to her father.

By 2013, the restaurant earned two Michelin stars making Dominique Crenn the first female chef to earn the distinction in the United States. In 2018, Atelier Crenn earned three Michelin stars for 2019 which again made her not only the first, but also the only female chef to do so in the United States. Crenn earned the award "best female chef in the world", a distinction she is dismissive of as she believes there is no reason for gender separation in culinary skills.

Atelier Crenn received a James Beard Award and joined "Michael Bauer's Four-Star Club".

Menu
As of 2022, the tasting menu cost approximately $445.92 per person (includes tax and tip, but not drinks). The menu is written as a poem, each line is influenced by her father's teachings of art and expresses Dominique's childhood on a farm. The 12 course tasting menu heavily focuses on fish.

The restaurant has been described as "wonderful balance of grace, artistry, technical ability and taste".

See also
 List of French restaurants
 List of Michelin starred restaurants
 List of Michelin 3-star restaurants in the United States

References

Further reading

External links

Restaurants in San Francisco
Michelin Guide starred restaurants in California
2011 establishments in California
Restaurants established in 2011
French restaurants in California